Orchids of Manipur is a 1993 non-feature Indian Meitei language film scripted by M. K. Binodini Devi and directed by Aribam Syam Sharma. It is produced by Sh. Tomchou Singh under the banner of Manipur Film Development Corporation (MFDC) Limited. The film was screened at the second edition of Fragrances from the North East 2014, a three-day festival of cinema from the northeast.

It was screened at the Yamagata International Documentary Film Festival 2019, Japan. The film also participated in International Wildlife Film Festival 1994, Morocco.

Synopsis
The film is a journey through the rich forests of Manipur that are home to beautiful varieties of orchids. Over four hundred species have been identified so far, and some of them are found exclusively in Manipur. The soil and climate of Manipur are very conducive to the growth of orchids and seventy percent of the varieties of orchids available in South-East Asia are found in Manipur. The Manipuri varieties are very popular and much in demand all over the world. In Manipuri culture, the orchids are not ordinary flowers and are loved, cared for and respected.

However, in recent years, due to heavy deforestation, these flowers have been adversely affected and some of the major species are threatened with extinction. The Forst Department of the Government of Manipur is taking steps for the preservation of the orchids.

Accolades
The film won the National Film Award for Best Non-Feature Environment/Conservation/Preservation Film at the 41st National Film Awards. The citation for the National Award reads, "For a colourful and extremely aesthetic presentation of the exalting abundance of the wild orchids of Manipur".

References

1993 films
Films directed by Aribam Syam Sharma
Meitei-language films